Route 216 is a state highway in southeastern Connecticut, running entirely within the town of North Stonington. It connects Route 49 to the Rhode Island state line and serves the village of Clarks Falls.

Route description
Route 216 begins at an intersection with Route 49 in the eastern part of the town of North Stonington. It heads east to the village of Clarks Falls, then continues southeast past the village intersecting I-95 (at exit 93) just shy of the Rhode Island state line.  It continues beyond the state line as RI Route 216. Route 216 is known as Clarks Falls Road for its entire length.

History
Route 216 was established between 1932 and 1934 as a continuation of the already existing Rhode Island Route 216. The original route followed Denison Hill Road through the Laurel Hill community of North Stonington.

Junction list

References

External links

216
Transportation in New London County, Connecticut
1934 establishments in Connecticut